Pestalotiopsis is a genus of ascomycete fungi in the Sporocadaceae family. 

Pestalotiopsis species are known as plant pathogens, common endophytes or saprobes in a variety of hosts and environments. The species of fungi within this genus are normally considered as secondary pathogens that can be responsible for a variety of plant diseases, including cankers, dieback, leaf spots, needle blight, tip blight, grey blight, severe chlorosis, fruit rots and various post-harvest diseases. Pestalotiopsis species occur as generalist endophytes in trees of Western Ghats forests of southern India. 
In Chile, Pestalotiopsis clavispora and other Pestalotiopsis spp. causes postharvest stem end rot on avocado plants. Pestalotiopsis spp. also cause leaf spot on Japanese persimmon.

19 different Pestalotiopsis species have been found as endophytes from bark and needles of Pinus armandii . in China. Botella and Diez reported the isolation of a Pestalotiopsis sp. from Pinus halepensis  in Spain, and Maharachchikumbura et al. referred to a Pestalotiopsis sp. isolated from a Pinus sp. in China. Pestalotiopsis species have also been isolated as endophytes from pine seeds of Pinus armandii in Yunnan province, China, and several other pine species across Europe and North America. Then in 2020, Pestalotiopsis pini sp. nov., was found as an emerging pathogen on Stone Pine (Pinus pinea ) and on Pinus pinaster in Portugal.<ref>{{cite journal |last1=Silva |first1=Ana Cristina |last2=Diogo |first2=Eugénio |last3=Henriques |first3=Joana |last4=Ramos |first4=Ana Paula |last5=Sandoval-Denis |first5=Marcelo |last6=Crous |first6=Pedro W. |last7=Bragança |first7=Helena |title='Pestalotiopsis pini sp. nov., an Emerging Pathogen on Stone Pine (Pinus pinea L.) |journal=Forests |date=2020 |volume=11 |issue=8 |page=805 |doi=10.3390/f11080805}}</ref>

The genus name of Pestalotiopsis is in honour of Fortunato Pestalozza (died 1878), who was an Italian botanist and doctor who worked in Constantinople and Antalya.

The genus was circumscribed by René Leopold Alix Ghislain Jules Steyaert in Bull. Jard. Bot. Etat. vol.19 on page 300 in 1949.

The sexual state of Pesalotiopsis is Pestalosphaeria, which was introduced by Barr (in 1975) with the type species Pestalosphaeria concentrica. This species was isolated from the grey-brown spots on the living leaves of Rhododendron maximum growing in North Carolina, USA.

Some members of the genus are able to grow on the synthetic polymer polyurethane as its sole carbon source under both aerobic and anaerobic conditions, hence show promise as a form of bioremediation for waste reduction.

Some members of the genus are able to produce taxol.

Species
As accepted by Species Fungorum;Pestalotiopsis abietis Pestalotiopsis aceris Pestalotiopsis acrocomiarum Pestalotiopsis acroramosa Pestalotiopsis adusta Pestalotiopsis aeruginea Pestalotiopsis affinis Pestalotiopsis aggestorum Pestalotiopsis albomaculans Pestalotiopsis algeriensis Pestalotiopsis aloes Pestalotiopsis alpiniae Pestalotiopsis anacardiacearum Pestalotiopsis anacardii Pestalotiopsis angusta Pestalotiopsis annonae Pestalotiopsis annulata Pestalotiopsis antenniformis Pestalotiopsis anthurii Pestalotiopsis antiaris Pestalotiopsis apiculata Pestalotiopsis aquatica Pestalotiopsis arachidis Pestalotiopsis arborei Pestalotiopsis arceuthobii Pestalotiopsis ardisiae Pestalotiopsis arengae Pestalotiopsis australasiae Pestalotiopsis australis Pestalotiopsis baarnensis Pestalotiopsis batatas Pestalotiopsis besseyi Pestalotiopsis betazamiae Pestalotiopsis bicilia Pestalotiopsis biciliata Pestalotiopsis bicolor Pestalotiopsis brachiata Pestalotiopsis brassicae Pestalotiopsis breviseta Pestalotiopsis brideliae Pestalotiopsis briosiana Pestalotiopsis bruguierae Pestalotiopsis bulbophylli Pestalotiopsis calabae Pestalotiopsis camelliae Pestalotiopsis camelliae-oleiferae Pestalotiopsis canangae Pestalotiopsis canarii Pestalotiopsis capitata Pestalotiopsis capparicola Pestalotiopsis carbonacea Pestalotiopsis caroliniana Pestalotiopsis carveri Pestalotiopsis casuarinae Pestalotiopsis caudata Pestalotiopsis cephalotaxi Pestalotiopsis ceratoniae Pestalotiopsis chamaeropis Pestalotiopsis chethallensis Pestalotiopsis chiangmaiensis Pestalotiopsis chinensis Pestalotiopsis cibotii Pestalotiopsis cinchonae Pestalotiopsis cinnamomi Pestalotiopsis citri Pestalotiopsis citrina Pestalotiopsis clavata Pestalotiopsis clusiae Pestalotiopsis coffeae Pestalotiopsis coffeae-arabicae Pestalotiopsis colombiensis Pestalotiopsis congensis Pestalotiopsis conigena Pestalotiopsis conspicua Pestalotiopsis coperniciae Pestalotiopsis crassiuscula Pestalotiopsis cruenta Pestalotiopsis cryptomeriae Pestalotiopsis cycadis Pestalotiopsis darjeelingensis Pestalotiopsis decolorata Pestalotiopsis dianellae Pestalotiopsis digitalis Pestalotiopsis dilleniae Pestalotiopsis dilucida Pestalotiopsis diploclisiae Pestalotiopsis disseminata Pestalotiopsis distincta Pestalotiopsis diversiseta Pestalotiopsis doitungensis Pestalotiopsis dracaenae Pestalotiopsis dracaenicola Pestalotiopsis dracontomelonis Pestalotiopsis effecta Pestalotiopsis elaeagni Pestalotiopsis elasticola Pestalotiopsis eleutherococci Pestalotiopsis endophytica Pestalotiopsis ericacearum Pestalotiopsis etonensis Pestalotiopsis eugeniae Pestalotiopsis eupyrena Pestalotiopsis eusora Pestalotiopsis fici Pestalotiopsis flagisetula Pestalotiopsis flavidula Pestalotiopsis formosana Pestalotiopsis fuchsiae Pestalotiopsis funerea Pestalotiopsis funereoides Pestalotiopsis furcata Pestalotiopsis gastrolobii Pestalotiopsis gaultheriae Pestalotiopsis gibberosa Pestalotiopsis gibbosa Pestalotiopsis gigas Pestalotiopsis glandicola Pestalotiopsis gossypii Pestalotiopsis gracilis Pestalotiopsis granati Pestalotiopsis grandis Pestalotiopsis gravesii Pestalotiopsis grevilleae Pestalotiopsis guangdongensis Pestalotiopsis guepini Pestalotiopsis hainanensis Pestalotiopsis hawaiiensis Pestalotiopsis heritierae Pestalotiopsis heterospora Pestalotiopsis heucherae Pestalotiopsis hispanica Pestalotiopsis hollandica Pestalotiopsis humicola Pestalotiopsis hunanensis Pestalotiopsis hydei Pestalotiopsis hypodermia Pestalotiopsis iberica Pestalotiopsis ilicis Pestalotiopsis inflexa Pestalotiopsis intermedia Pestalotiopsis italiana Pestalotiopsis ixorae Pestalotiopsis jacksoniae Pestalotiopsis japonica Pestalotiopsis javanica Pestalotiopsis jiangxiensis Pestalotiopsis jinchanghensis Pestalotiopsis juncestris Pestalotiopsis kaki Pestalotiopsis kandelicola Pestalotiopsis kenyana Pestalotiopsis keteleeriae Pestalotiopsis knightiae Pestalotiopsis krabiensis Pestalotiopsis kunmingensis Pestalotiopsis kwangsiensis Pestalotiopsis lagerstroemiae Pestalotiopsis lambertiae Pestalotiopsis langloisii Pestalotiopsis laughtonae Pestalotiopsis lawsoniae Pestalotiopsis leprogena Pestalotiopsis leucadendri Pestalotiopsis leucopogonis Pestalotiopsis leucothoes Pestalotiopsis licualicola Pestalotiopsis lijiangensis Pestalotiopsis lindquistii Pestalotiopsis linearis Pestalotiopsis loeiana Pestalotiopsis longiappendiculata Pestalotiopsis longiaristata Pestalotiopsis longiseta Pestalotiopsis lucumae Pestalotiopsis lushanensis Pestalotiopsis macadamiae Pestalotiopsis macadamii Pestalotiopsis macrochaeta Pestalotiopsis macrospora Pestalotiopsis maculans Pestalotiopsis maculiformans Pestalotiopsis magnoliae Pestalotiopsis malayana Pestalotiopsis malicola Pestalotiopsis mangiferae Pestalotiopsis mangifolia Pestalotiopsis matildae Pestalotiopsis mayumbensis Pestalotiopsis melaleucae Pestalotiopsis menezesiana Pestalotiopsis menhaiensis Pestalotiopsis metasequoiae Pestalotiopsis micheliae Pestalotiopsis microspora Pestalotiopsis millettiae Pestalotiopsis moluccensis Pestalotiopsis monochaeta Pestalotiopsis monochaetioides Pestalotiopsis montellica Pestalotiopsis montellicoides Pestalotiopsis moorei Pestalotiopsis nanjingensis Pestalotiopsis nanningensis Pestalotiopsis nattrassii Pestalotiopsis nattrassioides Pestalotiopsis neglecta Pestalotiopsis nelumbonis Pestalotiopsis neolitseae Pestalotiopsis novae-hollandiae Pestalotiopsis oenotherae Pestalotiopsis oleandri Pestalotiopsis oryzae Pestalotiopsis osyridis Pestalotiopsis owenii Pestalotiopsis oxyanthi Pestalotiopsis pachirae Pestalotiopsis paeoniae Pestalotiopsis paeoniicola Pestalotiopsis pallidicolor Pestalotiopsis pallidotheae Pestalotiopsis palmarum Pestalotiopsis pampeana Pestalotiopsis pandani Pestalotiopsis pandanicola Pestalotiopsis papposa Pestalotiopsis papuana Pestalotiopsis paraguariensis Pestalotiopsis parva Pestalotiopsis perseae Pestalotiopsis pestalozzioides Pestalotiopsis peyronelii Pestalotiopsis phaii Pestalotiopsis phoenicis Pestalotiopsis photiniicola Pestalotiopsis pini Pestalotiopsis pinicola Pestalotiopsis pipericola Pestalotiopsis pittospori Pestalotiopsis planimi Pestalotiopsis pleurocrinita Pestalotiopsis podocarpi Pestalotiopsis portugallica Pestalotiopsis psidii Pestalotiopsis puttemansii Pestalotiopsis puyae Pestalotiopsis pycnoides Pestalotiopsis quadriciliata Pestalotiopsis quercicola Pestalotiopsis rapanea Pestalotiopsis rhamni Pestalotiopsis rhizophorae Pestalotiopsis rhododendri Pestalotiopsis rhodomyrti Pestalotiopsis rosea Pestalotiopsis royenae Pestalotiopsis sabal Pestalotiopsis saccardensis Pestalotiopsis sapotae Pestalotiopsis schimae Pestalotiopsis scirpina Pestalotiopsis scoparia Pestalotiopsis sequoiae Pestalotiopsis shiraiana Pestalotiopsis shoreae Pestalotiopsis sichuanensis Pestalotiopsis siliquastri Pestalotiopsis sinensis Pestalotiopsis smilacicola Pestalotiopsis smilacis Pestalotiopsis sonsensis Pestalotiopsis sorbi Pestalotiopsis spathulata Pestalotiopsis spathuliappendiculata Pestalotiopsis stellata Pestalotiopsis stictica Pestalotiopsis subcuticularis Pestalotiopsis submersa Pestalotiopsis subshorea Pestalotiopsis suffocata Pestalotiopsis sydowiana Pestalotiopsis synsepali Pestalotiopsis taslimiana Pestalotiopsis tecomicola Pestalotiopsis telopeae Pestalotiopsis terminaliae Pestalotiopsis termitarii Pestalotiopsis terricola Pestalotiopsis thailandica 
 Pestalotiopsis thujicola Pestalotiopsis tiliae Pestalotiopsis toxica 
 Pestalotiopsis trachycarpicola Pestalotiopsis trichocladi Pestalotiopsis triseptata 
 Pestalotiopsis triseta 
 Pestalotiopsis unicolor Pestalotiopsis uvicola Pestalotiopsis ventricosa Pestalotiopsis verruculosa 
 Pestalotiopsis versicolor 
 Pestalotiopsis virgatula Pestalotiopsis vismiae Pestalotiopsis westerdykiae Pestalotiopsis woodfordiae Pestalotiopsis yanglingensis Pestalotiopsis yunnanensis 

Taxonomy
A phylogenetic analysis in 2013 with some of the Pestalotiopsis'' species are found in the following tree:

See also
 Organisms breaking down plastic

References

 
Fungal plant pathogens and diseases
Organisms breaking down plastic